KTCU-FM is a radio station in Fort Worth, Texas, broadcasting from Texas Christian University. The station has been on the air since October 5, 1964 and is broadcast out of TCU's studios with 10,000 Watts ERP.

KTCU is the college radio station affiliated with Texas Christian University in Fort Worth, Texas. Weekdays the format is primarily Indie Rock, Alternative, EDM, and Local Artists.

Primarily run by students, KTCU is an option for students from all majors to learn all aspects of radio while also providing a way to express themselves through music.

KTCU has a wide array of award-winning specialty shows such as The Good Show and Sputnik Radio on Saturdays. Monday through Friday KTCU features the "Local Lunch", a showcase of DFW artists from Noon - 1:00. Sunday programming includes Classical music, the University Christian Church service, and various public interest programming. TCU athletic events such as Women's Basketball and Baseball are also aired on KTCU.

Originally, KTCU was broadcast across the TCU campus and dormitories on 1025 AM from 1957–64.

Early notables include Russ Bloxom (later news anchor at WBAP/KXAS-TV, 1967–79,) Jerry Park (co-host of WFAA's "News 8 etc..." in the early 1970s, deceased,) John Moncrief (newscaster for TSN; now deceased,) Clem Candelaria (management at KTVT-TV,) Mike Marshall (Houston radio) and Sanda McQuerry (co-host of KTVT's "Reveille.")

Current management of KTCU is Janice McCall (Co-Manager and Music Director) and Geoffrey Craig (Co-Manager and Sports Director).

External links
 KTCU website

 DFW Radio/TV History

TCU
Texas Christian University
TCU-FM
Radio stations established in 1965
1965 establishments in Texas